The River Moselle, also referred to as Moselle Brook, is in North London and flows through Tottenham towards the Lea Valley. The river was originally a tributary of the River Lea, but it now flows into Pymmes Brook, another Lea tributary.

Description
The name derives from 'Mosse-Hill' in Hornsey, the high ground containing one of the river's sources, and bears no direct etymological relationship to the major continental Moselle River. The hill area also gave its name to the district of Muswell Hill, and for a time the river was known as the Moswell.

It flows north-eastward to Lordship Recreation Ground, then to High Road by the junction with White Hart Lane, then along High Road to a point near Scotland Green, and then flows eastward to the River Lea.

The Moselle has quite a modest flow in modern times, but it once posed a serious flooding threat to Tottenham. Until the 19th century, the whole of the river remained above ground, but in 1836 the stretch around Tottenham High Road and White Hart Lane was covered. More major culverting occurred in 1906 and subsequent years, so that now the river is completely enclosed from Tottenham Cemetery to the point at which it runs into Pymme's Brook.

See also
Subterranean rivers of London

References

External links
 silentuk.com  - Photos from inside the buried River Moselle (originally from the defunct website silentuk.com)
 Moselle River Report Some excellent historical photos and accounts
 A history of The Moselle on the Friends of Lordship Recreation Ground website

Rivers of London
M
Geography of the London Borough of Haringey
Subterranean rivers of London